Marsh Creek Lake is a man-made lake that resulted from the construction of a dam across Marsh Creek, filling a valley that prompted the relocation of residents from Milford Mills, Pennsylvania to higher ground.  The reasons for creating the lake were "... frequent flooding, water shortages and lack of recreational opportunities for nearby population centers...."

The lake is bordered by Marsh Creek State Park to the east and Lyndell, Pennsylvania to the west.

Gallery

References

Bodies of water of Chester County, Pennsylvania
Reservoirs in Pennsylvania